Starovičky is a municipality and village in Břeclav District in the South Moravian Region of the Czech Republic. It has about 900 inhabitants.

Notable people
Radek Juška (born 1993), athlete

References

Villages in Břeclav District